The Caproni Ca.72 was an Italian night bomber designed to reequip the post-World War I Italian Air Force.

Design and development
The Ca.72 was, overall, similar to the Caproni Ca.66 and Caproni Ca.67 in overall design . However, the Ca.72 differed from the Ca.67 in the addition of an SPA 6A engine, mounted as a pusher on the upper mainplane centre-line. Despite these changes, flight tests offered only a  increase in speed over the Ca.66. The Regia Aeronautica did not order the aircraft into production and the Ca.72 was abandoned in favor of the Caproni Ca.73.

Specifications

References

Ca.072
1920s Italian bomber aircraft
Aircraft first flown in 1924
Biplanes
Three-engined push-pull aircraft